Gurinder Chadha,  (born 10 January 1960) is a British film director of Indian origin. Most of her films explore the lives of Indians living in England. The common theme among her work showcases the trials of Indian women living in the UK and how they must reconcile their converging traditional and modern cultures. Although many of her films seem like simple quirky comedies about Indian women, they actually address many social and emotional issues, especially ones faced by immigrants caught between two worlds.

Much of her work also consists of adaptations from book to film, but with a different flair. She is best known for the films Bhaji on the Beach (1993), Bend It Like Beckham (2002), Bride and Prejudice (2004), Angus, Thongs and Perfect Snogging (2008), It's a Wonderful Afterlife (2010) and Viceroy's House (2017). Her latest features are the biographical musical comedy-drama Blinded by the Light and the television show Beecham House.

Early life 
Gurinder Chadha was born in Nairobi, Kenya, then a British colony. Her family was part of the Indian diaspora in East Africa. Her father and mother were both born in Kenya, and remained there until the political turbulence leading up to independence prompted the family to consider relocating. Her family held "united citizenship" under the British Nationality Act 1948 which granted them full rights of entry and settlement in Britain. Her father moved first and was joined by the family the following year in Southall, West London, when she was two years of age, where she attended Clifton Primary School. Chadha's father faced much prejudice because of his appearance as a Sikh Indian, wearing a turban and having a beard. Her father had worked as a clerical officer in Barclays Bank in Kenya and was unable to secure the same position due to his appearance.  Eventually, the family opened a shop to provide the family with an economic toehold.

Many of her future films would draw on her personal experience of being Indian and English at the same time, and how she dealt with the duality of her identity. Upon completion of her documentary I'm British but... Chadha insisted the premiere be held at the Southall Community Center to honor her home community. For example, she would not wear traditional Indian clothing, and she refused to cook for her family. In her mind, having all the women in the kitchen cooking while the men sat and ate was oppressive, although it is a living part of Indian culture. Therefore, she sat at the table with the men and was "extremely outspoken." After graduating from the University of East Anglia where she studied politics and developmental economics before radio journalism, Chadha attended the London College of Printing in 1984/85 and studied as a post-graduate. When she decided she wanted to go to the University of East Anglia to do development studies, her teachers suggested a secretarial course, or a lesser university.

Career 
After beginning her media career in radio in the mid-1980s, Chadha became a BBC television news reporter. She directed award-winning documentaries for the British Film Institute, BBC and Channel Four, and in 1989 released the documentary I'm British but... for Channel 4, which followed the lives of young British Asians. In 1990, Chadha established a production company, Umbi Films having no formal film training. Her first film was the 11-minute Nice Arrangement (1991) about a British Asian wedding. It was selected for the Cannes Film Festival Critic's section in 1991.

Chadha mentions the influence that the film Purab aur Pachhim had on her work, in an interview with Robert K. Elder for The Film That Changed My Life.
There's a wonderful kind of yearning quality about what is culture and the perils of living in the West and the dangers of what could happen.

Her affinity for stories about families was also attributed to her love for It's a Wonderful Life.

She was empowered by British Bhangra music which combines Punjabi folk rhythms, electronic instrumentation, Bombay film styles, and Western disco; I'm British, but... uses this type of music as a metaphor for syncretic nature of British Asian identity.

Her documentary Acting our Age (1992), set out to understand what it was like being Asian and elderly in Britain. During production she gave film crew to the elderly participants and allowed them to create their own film in order to challenge perception and layer spectator images.

Her first feature, Bhaji on the Beach (1994), won numerous international awards including a BAFTA Nomination for 'Best British Film of 1994' and the Evening Standard British Film Award for 'Best Newcomer to British Cinema'. Chadha first received wide recognition for the film in 1993. It was the first full-length feature film made by a British Asian woman. The film surrounds a day in the lives of Indian women, across different generations, and how they change in order to converge their cultural background with modern UK living. Chadha utilizes subtlety and nuances in dialogue and fashion in order to relay the fact that these women come from a very specific culture. For example, one character wears a leather jacket over her Indian garb, showing how she is fusing her two cultures together. Prejudice comes from both outside and inside the British-Indian community; white men treat the immigrants as garbage, while the older generation of Indian women judge the modern woman is challenged by the progressive views of the younger women, as they try to break free from the "oppression" that Chadha fought hard to break free from herself. Her 1994 interview with Ali Kazimi in Rungh Magazine focusses on many of the main themes in Bhaji on the Beach.

Issues of domestic abuse and male superiority are also showcased in the film, as one character and her young son are chased by her abusive husband and his family. Another character, who is expected to be a doctor by her parents and the local Indian community, becomes pregnant by a black classmate, which is a taboo in the community. The film was low budget, but received critical success for its take on racial stereotypes, immigration, and gender roles. Several major projects followed including Bend It Like Beckham (2002) and Bride and Prejudice (2004).

In 1995, she directed Rich Deceiver, a two-part drama for the BBC, watched by 11 million viewers.

Her award-winning films have earned over $300 million at the international box office.

What's Cooking? was the Opening Night Film of the 2000 Sundance Film Festival, and was the first British script to be invited to the Sundance Institute's Writer's Lab. The film was voted joint audience award winner in the New York Film Critics' 2000 season (tied with Billy Elliot), and Chadha won the award for Best British Director in the London Film Critics' Circle Awards.

Bend it Like Beckham was the highest grossing British-financed, British-distributed film, ever in the UK box-office (prior to the success of Slumdog Millionaire). The film was a critical and commercial success internationally, topping the box-office charts in the U.S., Australia, New Zealand, Switzerland and South Africa, and winning audience favourite film awards at the Locarno, Sydney and Toronto film festivals. The film received a Golden Globe Nomination for Best Picture (Musical or Comedy), a BAFTA Nomination for Best British Film, a European Film Academy Nomination for Best Film, and a Writers Guild of America Nomination for Best Original Screenplay. Like Bhaji on the Beach, Bend it Like Beckham features a strong Indian-British woman, Jess, who tries to realize her dreams while maneuvering through her duties as a daughter of traditional Indian parents. Although marketed to the United States as a "chick flick", it is regarded in Britain as an important post-feminist film that fits perfectly into the British progressive frame of 2002. Prime Minister Blair even wrote a congratulatory letter to Chadha, saying, "We loved it, loved it, because this is my Britain." Chadha herself meant for the film to be a "girl power" movie, which features both a white woman and an Indian-British woman fighting for their shared dream of playing professional soccer. It addressed issues of prejudice against race and sexuality, however, allowing the film to transcend the "chick flick" moniker. Topics of interracial coupling and lesbian stereotyping add meaning to the "girl power movie." In 2015, Chada mounted the stage musical version of Bend it Like Beckham in London's West End to 5-Star Reviews & critics' awards.

Bride and Prejudice, a film which marries Jane Austen with Indian and Western musicals, was the first film ever to open at Number One in the UK and India on the same day. It attempted to fuse Bollywood, Hollywood, and a "British sensibility" into one film. For each character and scene of the original novel, Chadha adds an Indian twist. For example, the original diversity of class between the two leads in the original book are changed into a diversity of race, having the female lead as an Indian and the male lead a white man. The film was not meant to be an actual Bollywood movie, however. Much of the film is Westernized for a Western audience. There are both Bollywood numbers and Western musical numbers inspired by the likes of "Grease" and "West Side Story".

She wrote the screenplay for The Mistress of Spices (2005), based upon the novel of the same name by Chitra Banerjee Divakaruni, with Berges, who directed the film.

In 2005, Chadha appeared on the BBC show Your London, in which she told the story of a Sikh prince who lived in London in the 19th century. In 2006, she took part in the BBC genealogy series Who Do You Think You Are? in which she traced her Sikh family roots back to Kenya and before that to India's Punjab.

Angus, Thongs and Perfect Snogging – based on the international bestseller, was released worldwide by Paramount Pictures in 2008/2009. It's a Wonderful Afterlife premiered at the Sundance Film Festival before releasing internationally in 2010.

Chadha has received several Honorary Doctorates from British universities and was awarded an O.B.E. in the 2006 Queen's Birthday Honours List on 17 June 2006 for her services to the British film industry.

Although the BBC had confirmed that Chadha was to direct the forthcoming feature film adaptation of the television series Dallas, she left the project in 2007.

As of 2011, Chadha was collaborating with composer A. R. Rahman and lyricist Stephen Schwartz on DreamWorks Animation's first musical set in India. She has announced an animated musical entitled Monkeys of Bollywood, based on the Indian epic Ramayana. Reportedly, the Bollywood-style animated musical is set in Mumbai and revolves around two monkeys who try to stop an ancient demon from conquering the world. It is produced by DreamWorks Animation.

Her film Viceroy's House, an epic drama on Indian Independence and Partition based on the books Freedom at Midnight by Larry Collins and Dominique Lapierre and The Shadow of the Great Game: The Untold Story of India's Partition by Narendra Singh Sunila, was released in 2017.

She was a guest on BBC Radio 4's Desert Island Discs in 2015.

Gurinder created, co-wrote and directed the Indian historical series Beecham House which aired on ITV in 2019.

Gurinder was announced to direct a film adaptation of the graphic novel Pashmina for Netflix.

Gurinder announced she will be remaking the 1983 French/Swiss film L'Argent to an English Hindi language film with Anne-Marie playing the lead and Raji James co-starring.

Personal life 
Chadha is married to American screenwriter and director Paul Mayeda Berges, and they have twins together, a boy named Ronak and a girl named Kumiko, born in 2007. Chadha has spoken out about representation of women in the film industry. At a 2017 Bird's Eye View event at Sands Films in London, Chadha stressed the importance of actively supporting female filmmakers at the cinema, especially on the opening weekend. She also noted that women can no longer be passive in the fight for change within a historically male-dominated industry.

The British Film Institute's recent filmography study on British Cinema history named Chadha as the U.K's most prolific female director working today and was honoured with the Sophiya Haque Services to British Television and Film Award at the 2017 Asian Media Awards.

She is an active patron of numerous charities including MAF (Medical Aid Films) is a Creative Mentor and Role Model for Creative Access, Directors UK Inspire, the BFI and the Sundance Directors' Lab, and Patron of Women in Film U.K.

With regard to her religious beliefs, Chadha told the BBC in an October 2014 interview:

Filmography

Television
 I'm British But... (1989) (TV)
 Pain, Passion and Profit (1992) (TV)
 Rich Deceiver (1995) (TV film)
 Desi Rascals (2015)
 Beecham House (2019)

Film

Appearances 
 Your London (2005)
 Koffee with Karan (2005)
 Who Do You Think You Are? (2006)
 BBC Asian (2010)

Recognition
She was recognized as one of the BBC's 100 women of 2013

See also 
 List of female film and television directors
 List of LGBT-related films directed by women
 Women's cinema
 British Indian
 Indian community of London
 List of British Sikhs

References

External links 

Biography and filmography from the British Film Institute's Screenonline
Interview: Gurinder Chadha The Observer
Gurinder Chadha on Who Do You Think You Are?
Interview: Gurinder Chadha The Guardian

1960 births
Living people
Alumni of the University of East Anglia
British people of Indian descent
British film directors
British people of Punjabi descent
English-language film directors
British Sikhs
German-language film directors
Officers of the Order of the British Empire
English Sikhs
Kenyan people of Indian descent
Kenyan people of Punjabi descent
English people of Indian descent
Kenyan emigrants to the United Kingdom
People from Southall
Punjabi people
British women film directors
BBC 100 Women